Thorsten Tönnies (born 13 March 1991) is a German former professional footballer who plays as a midfielder or defender for Blau-Weiß Lohne.

Career
Tönnies made his professional debut for Werder Bremen II on 21 August 2010 in the 3. Liga, coming on as a substitute for Lennart Thy against Hansa Rostock, which finished as a 2–0 away loss.

In summer 2021 Tönnies left Regionalliga Nord club SSV Jeddeloh to return to his youth club Blau-Weiß Lohne of the fifth-tier Oberliga Niedersachsen. Lohne targeted promotion to the Regionalliga Nord for the next two seasons.

Personal life
Tönnies works as a teacher in Bakum.

References

External links
 
 

1991 births
Living people
People from Vechta (district)
Footballers from Lower Saxony
German footballers
Germany youth international footballers
Association football defenders
3. Liga players
Regionalliga players
SV Werder Bremen II players
BSV Schwarz-Weiß Rehden players
VfB Oldenburg players
SSV Jeddeloh players